The Joint Directorate of Intrastructure Networks and Information Systems (Direction Interarmées des Réseaux d'Infrastructure et des Systèmes d'Information, or DIRISI) is a Communications and information systems organisation of the French Armed Forces.
The DIRISI was created on 1 January 2004 by decree of 31 December 2003.
The staff of the DIRISI is located at Fort de Bicetre in the town of Kremlin-Bicêtre (Val de Marne).

Among its installations is the Pierre-sur-Haute military radio station.

External links

Defence agencies of France
Military communications of France